Fossa is a village and parish in County Kerry, Ireland, north of the Lakes of Killarney.

Townlands in Fossa parish:
 Aghadoe
 Coolgarriv

Notable people 
David Clifford (1999–)
Michael Fassbender (1977–), born in Heidelberg, lived in Fossa

See also
 List of towns and villages in Ireland

References

Towns and villages in County Kerry